NGC 4595 is a spiral galaxy located about 42 million light-years away in the constellation Coma Berenices. NGC 4595 was discovered by astronomer William Herschel on January 14, 1787. NGC 4595 is a member of the Virgo Cluster.

See also
 List of NGC objects (4001–5000)

References

External links

Coma Berenices
Intermediate spiral galaxies
4595
42396
7826
Astronomical objects discovered in 1787
Discoveries by William Herschel
Virgo Cluster